Nuestra Belleza San Luis Potosí 2011, was held at the Teatro “Benito Juárez” in Cedral, San Luis Potosí on July 15, 2011. At the conclusion of the final night of competition Lorena Alvarado of San Luis Potosí City was crowned the winner. Alvarado was crowned by outgoing Nuestra Belleza San Luis Potosí titleholder Carmen Hernández. Eight contestants competed for the title.

Results

Placements

Contestants

References

External links
Official Website

Nuestra Belleza México